"Holdin on to Black Metal" is a song by American rock band My Morning Jacket, published by ATO Records in 2011.

Formats and track listings

Charts

Weekly charts

References

External links
 

My Morning Jacket songs
2011 songs
Song articles with missing songwriters